The Killy Literaturlexikon - Autoren und Werke des deutschsprachigen Kulturraumes is an author's lexicon of German language literature. The latest edition of twelve volumes was published between 2008 and September 2011 by De Gruyter. A register volume followed in 2012.

The encyclopaedia, originally published by Walther Killy, was named Literaturlexikon. Autoren und Werke deutscher Sprache (15 volumes). It was published by C. Bertelsmann Verlag from 1988 to 1993. The articles contain detailed information on the life and work of the authors as well as detailed and up-to-date information on secondary literature. Due to the high price, it is mainly found in libraries. The selection of the authors is based on a broad concept of literature, so that the encyclopaedia also contains an article on Eugen Drewermann.

Editions 
 Walther Killy (ed.): Literaturlexikon. Bertelsmann-Lexikon-Verlag, Gütersloh & Munich 1988–1993. 14 volumes and 1 index volume:
 Vol. 1. A – Bis. 1988, .
 Vol. 2. Bit – Dav. 1989, .
 Vol. 3. Dea – Fre. 1989, .
 Vol. 4. Fri – Hap. 1989, .
 Vol. 5. Har – Hug. 1990, .
 Vol. 6. Huh – Kräf. 1990, .
 Vol. 7. Kräm – Mas. 1990, .
 Vol. 8. Mat – Ord. 1990, .
 Vol. 9. Ore – Roq. 1991, .
 Vol. 10. Ros – Sel. 1991, .
 Vol. 11. Sem – Var. 1991, .
 Vol.12. Vas – Z. 1992, .
 Vol. 13. Begriffe, Realien, Methoden. 1992, .
 Vol. 14. Begriffe, Realien, Methoden. 1993, .
 Vol. 15. Register. 1993, .
 Wilhelm Kühlmann (ed.), Walther Killy: Killy Literaturlexikon. Autoren und Werke des deutschsprachigen Kulturraumes. 2., vollst. überarb. Aufl. de Gruyter, Berlin 2008–2012. 12 volumes and 1 Registerband:
 Vol. 1 A – Blu. 2008, .
 Vol. 2 Boa – Den. 2008, .
 Vol. 3 Dep – Fre. 2008, .
 Vol. 4 Fri – Hap. 2009, .
 Vol. 5 Har – Hug. 2009, .
 Vol. 6 Huh – Kräf. 2009, .
 Vol. 7 Kräm – Marp. 2010, .
 Vol. 8 Marq – Or. 2010, .
 Vol. 9 Os – Roq. 2010, .
 Vol. 10 Ros – Se. 2011, .
 Vol. 11 Si – Vi. 2011, .
 Vol. 12 Vo – Z. 2011, .
 Vol. 13 Register. 2012, .

References

External links 
 
 Das Killy Literaturlexikon auf der Verlagshomepage

German encyclopedias
German-language encyclopedias